Bushell is a surname of English origin. The name refers to:

Achieng Ajulu-Bushell (b. 1994), a British swimmer
Agnes Bushell (b. 1949) is an American fiction writer and teacher
Anthony Bushell (1904–1997), English film actor
Bill Bushell (b. 1891), an Australian rules footballer
Browne Bushell (1609–1651), English naval officer executed for treason
Christopher Bushell (1888–1918), English recipient of the Victoria Cross for action during World War I
Edward Bushel (fl. 1670), foreman of an English jury that refused to return a guilty verdict under coercion
Garry Bushell (b. 1955), English journalist, television presenter, and author
Garvin Bushell (1902–1991), American woodwind multi-instrument musician
Jeffrey Bushell, American screenwriter
John Bushell (1715–1761), first printer in Canada
Josette Bushell-Mingo (b. 1964), British theater actor and director
Mike Bushell, English television sports presenter on BBC
Mike Bushell (racing driver) (b. 1989), English Racing Driver and Renault Clio Cup Champion, 2014
Mickey Bushell (b. 1990), British paralympic athlete
Roger Bushell (1910–1944), South African pilot in Britain during World War II
Stephen Wootton Bushell (1844–1908), English physician and Orientalist
Steve Bushell (b. 1972), English professional football player
Thomas Bushell (1834–1865), Irish convict transported to Australia
Warin Foster Bushell (1885–1974), schoolmaster in England and South Africa